Chimnaz Mammad gizi Babayeva (23 December 1946 – 23 December 2019) was an Azerbaijani ballerina. She was awarded the title People's Artist of the Azerbaijan SSR, and Laureate of the State Prize of the Azerbaijan SSR.

Biography 
Chimnaz Babayeva was born on December 23, 1946 in Baku. From 1954 to 1964 she studied at Baku Choreography School, after graduating from high school, she had been a soloist at Azerbaijan State Opera and Ballet Theater. Later, she worked as a coach-pedagogue in the theater, and in recent years she moved away from the stage due to her illness.

Chimnaz Babayeva died on December 23, 2019, her 73rd birthday.

Career 
At the age of 9, she appeared on the big stage for the first time as Buratino in the ballet of Boris Zeidman "The Golden Key". Together with his wife Vladimir Pletnyov she had set up dance for the opera "The Fate of the Singer" (Jahangir Jahangirov). She had performed with the troupe of Azerbaijan State Academic Opera and Ballet Theater in many countries (France, Italy, Norway, Sweden, Burma, India, Turkey, etc.).

The main parts performed by Chimnaz Babayeva:

Awards 
 Honored Artist of the Azerbaijan SSR — 21 May 1970
 People's Artist of the Azerbaijan — 10 January 1978
 State Prize of the Azerbaijan SSR — 1974
 Personal pension of the President of the Republic of Azerbaijan — 11 June 2002

References 

Azerbaijani ballerinas
1946 births
2019 deaths